Contrex is a brand of mineral water owned since 1992 by Nestlé Waters, a branch of the Swiss group Nestlé,  and is part of the Vittel mineral water company that includes Vittel and Hépar. The water, whose source is located in Contrexéville in the French département of Vosges, was discovered by Charles Bagard, the first doctor of Louis XV.

Information
The water is bottled in a 250,000 m² factory complex that employs around 900 people. 635 million bottles of all kinds are produced a year, of which 11% are exported. The bottling factory is connected by pipelines with the Vittel factory in Vittel, a few kilometers from Contrexéville, which permits bottling of the Contrex water in either Vittel or in Contrexéville.

Contrex is a highly mineralized water and has diuretic properties.

References

External links
Official Website 
Water Softening System
ECA Water Generator

1861 establishments in France
Bottled water brands
Drinking water
Nestlé brands